Soccer United Marketing is the for-profit marketing arm of Major League Soccer which primarily deals in the promotion and sanctioning of professional soccer in the United States.

In 2016, Soccer United Marketing was also chosen as the exclusive worldwide marketing partner of CONCACAF and CONMEBOL. CONMEBOL describes Soccer United Marketing as "the preeminent commercial soccer enterprise in North America, overseeing the marketing, promotion and operational execution of the region’s most successful soccer entities." It goes on to describe Soccer United Marketing as the business that "holds the exclusive commercial rights to Major League Soccer and the United States Soccer Federation, as well as promotional, operational and marketing rights to Mexico national football team games played in the United States."

Soccer United Marketing has also assisted in the organization of several international soccer events with North American involvement, including the North American SuperLiga, the Pan-Pacific Championship, and the CONCACAF Gold Cup.

Affiliations with USSF and its leadership

Roger A. Pielke, Jr., author, professor, and chair of the Sports Governance Center in the Department of Athletics at the University of Colorado Boulder, confirms that Soccer United Marketing, as the marketing arm of Major League Soccer, is affiliated with the United States Soccer Federation. Regarding the relationship between Soccer United Marketing and United States Soccer Federation, Pielke writes that the United States Soccer Federation "exempts from its conflict of interest policy 'any constituent or affiliated member entities of U.S. Soccer'", which includes Major League Soccer and Soccer United Marketing.

Pielke writes, sourcing the New York Daily News, that this conflict of interest exemption allowed Sunil Gulati to become President of the United States Soccer Federation while also being a founder, board member, and deputy commissioner of Major League Soccer, and a member of Soccer United Marketing's Board of Directors.

Describing the relationship between Major League Soccer and the United States Soccer Federation, MLS Commissioner and Soccer United Marketing CEO Don Garber told Sports Illustrated, "Sunil and Dan (Flynn) had this view that as the governing body of the sport they would make commitments on the commercial side and on the competitive side to have MLS be the leader of the sport." He continued to say, "That's not something that exists in other parts of the world. I believe that Sunil could have made a different decision when he came in as president (in 2006) and had he made that decision MLS isn't be what it is today. Because we are joined at the hip.”

Similarly describing the relationship between Soccer United Marketing and the United States Soccer Federation, USSF President Sunil Gulati said, "The growth of the game goes hand in hand with what the league has done over the last 16 years and the growth of so much of what's going on in U.S. Soccer. The working relationship between the two is extraordinary and my guess is there aren’t many in the world that are like that. We don’t have the sorts of conflicts you see between leagues and federations – that's a plus."

Soccer United Marketing and the United States Soccer Federation have played a key role in cementing Major League Soccer as the first division of professional closed-league soccer in America, which the Professional Council of United States Soccer Federation describes as "a unique ownership and operating structure, based on a 'single entity' concept." The Professional Council goes on to explain that "MLS" 'single entity' structure allows investors to own an interest in the league, as well as individual teams."

References

External links
Official website

Major League Soccer
Marketing companies of the United States
Marketing companies established in 2002
Sports companies